Terence Roberts (born 1959/1960) is the current mayor of Anderson, South Carolina, the county seat of Anderson County, South Carolina. Serving since July 1, 2006, he is the first African-American mayor of the city.

Biography
Terence Roberts was born on November 26, 1959 (aged 62). He was raised in Anderson and is a 1978 graduate of West Side High School in Anderson. He graduated with a B.A. in marketing from Winthrop University. After school he started his own insurance agency.

In 2006, he defeated 2-term incumbent mayor Richard Shirley by a vote of 2,219 to 1,887 becoming the first Black mayor of the city.

He was certified as the winner of the April 8, 2018, election, as the only candidate for mayor, and automatically reelected for a fourth term, July 1, 2018, to June 30, 2022.

References

External links
 
 Mayor sets the course for 2007 Doug Staley, Anderson Independent-Mail News, January 12, 2007, 'State of the City' address

Living people
Mayors of places in South Carolina
African-American mayors in South Carolina
African-American people in South Carolina politics
People from Anderson, South Carolina
21st-century African-American people
Winthrop University alumni
Year of birth missing (living people)